Peter Schifrin (born January 5, 1958) is an American Olympic epee fencer and sculptor.

Early and personal life
Schifrin was born in Los Angeles, California, lived in Santa Rosa, California, and is Jewish. His father was a professional artist.  After attending San Jose State University, where he earned a BA as a fine arts major, he earned a Master of Fine Arts (MFA) from Boston University.

Fencing career
Schifrin began fencing at age 13. While in high school he won the Junior National Epee Championship in both 1976 and 1977.

He attended and fenced for San Jose State University on a fencing scholarship from 1979 through 1982. There, Schifrin was a four-time All-American, and had a 266-35 win-loss record. He won the 1982 NCAA Epee National Championship—thereby becoming the university's first and only NCAA champion in men's fencing.

Schifrin represented the United States at the 1979 Pan American Games team, winning a gold medal, and competed at the 1979 Summer Universiade and the 1981 Summer Universiade. He won a silver medal in epee at the 1981 Maccabiah Games.

He competed in the team épée event at the 1984 Summer Olympics.

Schifrin was inducted into the San Jose State University Sports Hall of Fame, in the Class of 2005.

Art career
Schifrin became a poet and an artist, trained in figurative and portrait sculpture, and began making textured works in both metal and clay. He has had multiple commissioned works in California: he designed and executed a bronze firefighter in San Ramon, a bronze "Wounded Man" for San Mateo's Performing Arts Center, and a set of bronze coyotes for downtown San Jose. Schifrin also created "Wings," a series of three sculptures installed on Martha's Vineyard. Schifrin and another sculptor, David Duskin, created "J-Line," which was commissioned by another fencing Olympian, Stephen Trevor, a private equity manager. He has works on display with the Art of the Olympians.

Schifrin also teaches as an instructor at the Academy of Art University in San Francisco. He was voted into the National Sculpture Society in 2011.

References

External links
 

1958 births
Living people
American male épée fencers
Olympic fencers of the United States
Fencers at the 1984 Summer Olympics
Sportspeople from Los Angeles
Boston University College of Fine Arts alumni
San Jose State University alumni
Pan American Games medalists in fencing
Pan American Games gold medalists for the United States
Pan American Games silver medalists for the United States
Jewish American sportspeople
Jewish male épée fencers
American male sculptors
Jewish sculptors
National Sculpture Society members
Fencers at the 1979 Pan American Games
21st-century American Jews
Medalists at the 1979 Pan American Games